The Hsin Ji Building is a skyscraper office building located in Xinyi District, Taipei, Taiwan. The building was completed in 1997 and is located next to Taipei Century Plaza, which was also completed in the same year. It houses the Taiwan Gospel Book Room as well as the Taiwan branch offices of Cisco Systems, eBay, IWG plc and Verizon.

In 2017, in order to enhance the energy-saving awareness of commercial office buildings in Taipei and to establish a model for cooperation, the Department of Economic Development of Taipei City Government and Hsin Ji Building have promoted the introduction of smart grid facilities in commercial buildings. By expanding the use of renewable energy and demonstrating the effects of smart energy saving, it hopes to attract more commercial and office buildings to join the city's ranks of smart electricity saving and green energy recycling.

See also 
 List of tallest buildings in Taiwan
 List of tallest buildings in Taipei
 Taipei Century Plaza
 Asia Plaza Building
 Xinyi Anhe MRT Station Entrance Building

References

1997 establishments in Taiwan
Buildings and structures in Taipei
Skyscraper office buildings in Taipei
Office buildings completed in 1997